Parisonatina al'Dodecafonia is a 1964 composition by Donald Martino for violoncello solo.

Background
The work shows a relentless preference in exploring notes in a twelve-tone system. It also consistently approaches the structure and cellistic technique through an imaginative approach. The title is a wordplay on the name of virtuoso cellist Aldo Parisot for whom the piece was composed. His name appears embedded throughout in a short succession of notes producing a single impression that appears throughout the entire piece.

It was written in four movements, though it was actually conceived in two parts of a two movement context. A performance takes about ten minutes.

Sources

Solo cello pieces
Twelve-tone compositions
1964 compositions